This Paralympic Games results index is a list of links to articles containing results of each Paralympic sport at the Summer Paralympics and Winter Paralympics. Years not appearing are those when the event was not held. Years in italics mean it was a demonstration sport.

Summer Paralympics
The Summer Paralympic Games have been held every four years since 1960.

Archery

Athletics

Boccia

Football 5-a-side

Football 7-a-side

Cycling

Dartchery

 1960
 1964
 1968
 1972
 1976
 1980

Equestrian

Goalball

Judo

Lawn bowls
Lawn bowls was on the program from 1968 to 1988, and in 1996.

Paracanoe

Paratriathlon

Powerlifting

Rowing

Sailing

Shooting

Snooker

Swimming

Table tennis

Volleyball

Weightlifting

Wheelchair basketball

Wheelchair fencing

Wheelchair rugby

Wheelchair tennis

Wrestling
Wrestling was contested in 1980 and 1984.

Winter Paralympics
The Winter Paralympic Games were held every four years from 1976 to 1992, and then every four years since 1994.

Alpine skiing

Ice sledge hockey

Ice sledge speed racing

Nordic skiing

Biathlon

Cross-country skiing

Snowboarding

Wheelchair curling

See also
 Olympic results index

Paralympic Games